The Lužnice is a river in the Czech Republic (204 km) starting in Austria (4 km). It flows into the Vltava river in Týn nad Vltavou (approximately 50 km north of České Budějovice). The river drains 4,226 square kilometers.

The river was first mentioned in sources in the year 1179. The name is derived from an old Czech for water flowing through the meads. Several places on the river are popular destinations for recreation and canoeing.

Towns and cities on the Lužnice river
 Weitra (Austria)
 Gmünd (Austria)
 České Velenice
 Suchdol nad Lužnicí
 Třeboň
 Veselí nad Lužnicí
 Soběslav
 Planá nad Lužnicí
 Sezimovo Ústí
 Tábor
 Bechyně
 Týn nad Vltavou

References

External links

 Basic information 
 Detailed information 

Rivers of the South Bohemian Region
Rivers of Lower Austria
International rivers of Europe
 
Rivers of Austria